Fuelling Poverty is a 2012 Nigerian documentary by Ishaya Bako that narrates the activities of the Occupy Nigeria movement when it was at its climax in early 2012. The 28 minutes video also features special appearances from Nobel Laureate Wole Soyinka, Femi Falana, Nasir Ahmad el-Rufai, Seun Kuti and Desmond Elliot. It won the Best Documentary award at the 9th Africa Movie Academy Awards.

Censorship
The Nigerian government through the National Film and Video Censors Board (NFVCB) banned the video from public exhibition stating that "...the contents of the film are highly provocative and likely to incite or encourage public disorder and undermine national security." The Producers of the documentary through NFVCB Lawyer were also "...strongly advised not to distribute or exhibit the documentary film. All relevant national security agencies are on the alert...".

See also
 List of Nigerian films of 2012

References

External links
 Fuelling Poverty on YouTube

Nigerian documentary films
2012 documentary films
Best Documentary Africa Movie Academy Award winners
2012 films
Documentary films about African politics
Politics of Nigeria
Occupy movement
Films directed by Ishaya Bako